Daniel Gollán (born 5 June 1955) is an Argentine cardiologist and politician. He served as Health Minister of Argentina for a brief period during the presidency of Cristina Fernández de Kirchner in 2015, and as Health Minister of Buenos Aires Province from 2019 to 2021. Since 2021, he has been a National Deputy.

Early life and education
Gollan was born on 5 June 1955 in Rosario. He studied medicine at the National University of Rosario, during the Dirty War. As a student, he joined the Juventud Universitaria Peronista, the Justicialist Party's student wing, where he met the future president Néstor Kirchner. He studied under the guidance of the cardiologist Floreal Ferrara.

Political career
He led the ANMAT from 2008 to 2010, and advised the Carta Abierta group on health-related issues.
He was appointed minister of health in Argentina, on 26 February 2015. Replacing Juan Luis Manzur. Kirchnerism could not achieve a victory for Daniel Scioli in the 2015 presidential election that allowed him to prevent a ballotage, and runs for a runoff election against Mauricio Macri. Kirchnerism reacted with a negative campaigning against Macri. Gollan said, in his Twitter account, "The 12 new radiation therapy centers to treat cancer will continue if Scioli is president. Think well before you vote". The opposition asked for his resignation, and Gollan deleted the post and claimed that his account had been hacked. Still, his previous posts had a similar tone. Anyhow, the statements in this negative campaigning showed to be true, as after Scioli lost the election and Mauricio Macri become the President of Argentina, many hospitals were closed, Argentina's public health system was seriously deteriorated  and the Health Ministry itself was demoted to a Secretariat, with lower budget and less decision powers.

Ahead of the 2021 primary elections, Gollán was confirmed as the second candidate in the Frente de Todos list to the Argentine Chamber of Deputies in Buenos Aires Province. He resigned from his post as Health Minister of the province on 28 July 2021 to focus on the campaign, and was succeeded by his vice-minister, Nicolás Kreplak.

Electoral history

References

1955 births
Living people
People from Rosario, Santa Fe
Argentine cardiologists
Argentine ministers of health
Justicialist Party politicians
Members of Carta Abierta
Members of the Argentine Chamber of Deputies elected in Buenos Aires Province